The 2020–21 Serie D was the seventy-third edition of the top level Italian non-professional football championship. It represents the fourth tier in the Italian football league system.

Changes from 2019–20 
A total 166 clubs were admitted to the season, including the new incarnation of former Serie A club Siena.

Teams 
The composition of the league will involve nine divisions, grouped geographically and named alphabetically.

Teams relegated from Serie C 
A total of eight teams from the 2019–20 Serie C were admitted: Siena (phoenix club, admitted after the previous club's incarnation did not apply for membership), Picerno (relegated by office due to match-fixing) and the relegated teams Pianese, Gozzano, Arzignano, Rimini, Rende and Rieti.

Teams promoted from Eccellenza 
Due to the COVID-19 related suspension of all amateur sports leagues in Italy, promotions were picked explicitly by the Italian Football Federation based on the leagues' provisional standings at the premature conclusion of the season. No promotion playoffs were held, nor was the final phase of the Coppa Italia Dilettanti (whose winning team is normally automatically admitted into Serie D).

Abruzzo
 Castelnuovo Vomano
Apulia
 Molfetta
Basilicata
 Lavello
 Rotonda
Calabria
 San Luca
Campania
 Afragolese
 Puteolana
 Santa Maria Cilento
Emilia Romagna
 Bagnolese
 Corticella
 Marignanese
Friuli Venezia Giulia
 Manzanese
Lazio
 Insieme Ausonia
 Montespaccato

Liguria
 Imperia
 Sestri Levante
Lombardy
 Busto 81
 Casatese
 Telgate
 Vis Nova Giussano
Marche
 Castelfidardo
Molise
 Comprensorio Vairano
 Tre Pini Matese
Piedmont & Aosta Valley
 Derthona
 PDHAE
 Saluzzo
Sardinia
 Carbonia

Sicily
 Dattilo Noir
 Paternò
 Sant'Agata 
Trentino Alto Adige – Südtirol
 Trento
Tuscany
 Badesse
 Pro Livorno
 Sinalunghese
Umbria
 Tiferno Lerchi
Veneto
 Sona
 Union San Giorgio Sedico 

  merged with Città di Varese
  merged with Grumellese under the new denomination of Real Calepina
  merged with Tre Pini Matese under the new denomination FC Matese

Events 
Due to the second wave of the COVID-19 pandemic in Italy, the Lega Nazionale Dilettanti, who is responsible for the organization of the league, decided on 5 November 2020 to suspend the regular Serie D programme until 29 November, instead using this prolonged break to reschedule all games that could not be played due to COVID-19 related health concerns.

Girone A

League table

Girone B

League table

Girone C

League table

Girone D

League table

Girone E

League table

Girone F

League table

Girone G

League table

Girone H

League table

Girone I

League table

References

4
Serie D seasons
Italy
Italy